Ab Daw is a village in Badakhshan Province, about 16 miles northwest of Zebak. Historically, the majority of its inhabitants are Tajiks.

References

Villages in Afghanistan
Populated places in Warduj District